The Slazenger Pro Championships  its sponsorship name  is a defunct men's professional tennis tournament that was played on outdoor grass courts from 1946 to 1964. The tournament featured both singles and doubles competitions.

History
The tournament was staged at two locations first in Scarborough, North Yorkshire, England from (1946–1955 & 1957) and also in Eastbourne from (1955–1956, 1958–1964)

Finals

References

External links
 Slazenger Pro Championships Roll of Honour

Defunct tennis tournaments in the United Kingdom
Grass court tennis tournaments
Tennis tournaments in England
Professional tennis tournaments before the Open Era
Sport in Scarborough, North Yorkshire
Sport in East Sussex